Philip J. Furlong (September 8, 1892 – April 13, 1989) was a Catholic bishop, serving as Auxiliary Bishop of the United States Military Vicariate from 1956 to 1971.

Biography
Born in New York City on September 8, 1892, Furlong attended Cathedral College and St. Joseph's Seminary in Yonkers, NY and was ordained a priest of the Archdiocese of New York on May 18, 1918. After receiving a doctorate in philosophy from Fordham University, in 1920 Furlong became a professor of history at Cathedral College and eventually dean and president from 1938 to 1941. At its completion in 1941 Furlong became the first principal of Cardinal Hayes High School in the Bronx until 1945 and served as secretary of education for the New York archdiocese. In 1950, he was named pastor of St. Thomas More in Manhattan, a post he held until retiring in 1969.

Furlong was active in many educational and historical societies. Catholic elementary school students across the United States learned American history from his eight-volume textbook series, The Furlong History Series, written in the 1920s through 1940s. He was a national chaplain for the Girl Scouts from 1946 to 1955.

Furlong was national Catholic chaplain of the Civil Air Patrol and a member of the Naval Aviation Cadet Selection Board from 1942 to 1945. He was also chaplain, with the rank of major, for the 8th Regiment of the New York National Guard from 1943 to 1948. With this experience, on December 3, 1955, Furlong was appointed Auxiliary Bishop to the US Military Vicariate, a responsibility at the time of the archbishop of New York. Cardinal Francis Spellman, Archbishop of New York, consecrated Furlong bishop on January 25, 1956. At the death of Cardinal Spellman on December 2, 1967, Furlong served as administrator of the military vicariate until the appointment of Archbishop (later Cardinal) Terence Cooke as new military vicar on April 4, 1968.

Furlong retired from the Vicariate in 1971 at 78 and died April 13, 1989, in the rectory of St. Thomas More as Auxiliary Bishop Emeritus, at 96, the oldest Roman Catholic bishop in the United States.

See also

 Catholic Church hierarchy
 Catholic Church in the United States
 Historical list of the Catholic bishops of the United States
 Insignia of Chaplain Schools in the US Military
 List of Catholic bishops of the United States
 List of Catholic bishops of the United States: military service
 Lists of patriarchs, archbishops, and bishops
 Military chaplain
 Religious symbolism in the United States military
 United States military chaplains

References
New York Times obituary April 15, 1989

External links
 Archdiocese for the Military Services, USA, official website
 Archdiocese for the Military Services of the United States. GCatholic.org. Retrieved 2010-08-20.

Participants in the Second Vatican Council
American chaplains 
United States Army chaplains
American textbook writers
American male non-fiction writers
Saint Joseph's Seminary (Dunwoodie) alumni
Fordham University alumni
Writers from New York City
1892 births
1989 deaths
Chaplains
20th-century Roman Catholic bishops in the United States
20th-century American male writers